Beresford is an English name. It has its roots in the village of Beresford in the parish of Alstonefield, North Staffordshire, or in some cases from Burford (originally Berford), in Oxfordshire. The placenames are derived from the Olde English pre-7th century words "beofor", meaning beaver, plus "forda", a shallow river crossing. The name is known since the 13th century, and may refer to the following notable people: 
Given name
Beresford Baker (1847–1933), Irish first-class cricketer
Beresford Clark (1902–1968), British broadcaster
Beresford Craddock (1898–1976), British Conservative politician
Beresford Egan (1905–1984), British satirical draughtsman, painter, novelist, actor, costume designer and playwright
Beresford Horsley (1880–1923), English cricketer
Beresford Kidd (1864–1948), Anglican priest and Church historian
Beresford Melville (1857–1931), British Conservative politician
Beresford Parlett (born 1932), British applied mathematician
Beresford Potter (1853–1931), Archdeacon in Cyprus and Syria 
Beresford Richards (1914–1982), Canadian politician

Surname
Alex Beresford (born 1980), English TV weather presenter, model
Anna Thynne (1806–1866), British marine zoologist, born Anna Beresford
Anne Beresford (born 1929), English poet
Bruce Beresford (born 1940), Australian film director
Lord Charles Beresford (1846–1919), British Admiral and Member of Parliament
C. R. Beresford (1888–1945), Australian journalist
Claude Richard Beresford (1888–1945), South Australian journalist with The News
David Beresford (journalist) (1947–2016), author, journalist
David Beresford (born 1976), retired English footballer
Elisabeth Beresford (1926–2010), British children's author; creator of The Wombles
George Beresford (disambiguation), several people including –
George Beresford (clergyman) (1765–1841), Irish clergyman
Lord George Beresford (1781–1839), Irish-born British politician
George Charles Beresford (1864–1938), Victorian studio photographer
Harry Beresford (1863–1944), British stage and film actor
Henry Beresford, 2nd Marquess of Waterford (1772–1826)
Herbert Beresford (1880–1938), Canadian land surveyor
Jack Beresford (1899–1977), English Rower, won medals at five separate Olympic Games
James Beresford (disambiguation), several people including –
James Beresford (writer) (1764–1840), British clergyman and writer
James Beresford (baseball) (born 1989), Australian baseball player
James Beresford (footballer), English footballer
J. D. Beresford (1873–1947), English writer
John Beresford (disambiguation), several people including –
Lord John Beresford, the Archbishop of Armagh (Church of Ireland)
John Beresford (statesman) (1738–1805), Irish statesman
Sir John Beresford, 1st Baronet (1766–1844), British naval officer and politician
John Claudius Beresford (1766–1846), Irish politician,
Julius Beresford (1868–1959), English rower, Jack Beresford's father
Lucy Beresford, British writer and psychotherapist
Marcus Beresford (disambiguation), several people including
Lord Marcus Beresford (1846–1922), equerry and racing manager
Marcus Beresford (1818–1890), British Conservative Party politician
Marlon Beresford (born 1969), English former footballer
Maurice Beresford (1920–2005), English economic historian
Meg Beresford (born 1937), General Secretary of the Campaign for Nuclear Disarmament 1985–1990
Paul Beresford (born 1946), British Conservative Party politician
Peter Beresford (born 1945), British writer, academic, researcher and activist
Randal Beresford (died 1681), Irish politician and baronet
Steve Beresford (born 1950), British musician
Sir Tristram Beresford, 3rd Baronet (1669–1701), Irish MP
William Beresford (politician) (1797–1883), British Conservative politician
William Carr Beresford, 1st Viscount Beresford (1768–1856), British general who fought in the Peninsular War
Lord William Beresford (1847–1900), Irish recipient of the VC

Fictional characters

 Tommy and Tuppence Beresford, detectives created by Agatha Christie
 Sir Raleigh Beresford, Father Brown (2013 TV series), series 3 episode 2, "The Curse of Amenhotep"
 Beresford the Crane, introduced in Thomas & Friends: Journey Beyond Sodor
 John Beresford Tipton, the title benefactor of The Millionaire (TV series), a 1955–1960 American television series

See also
 Beresford baronets

References

English masculine given names
English toponymic surnames